World Empire is a turn-based strategy video game, published in 1991 by Viable Software Alternatives.  Risk is similar to this game in that players compete to conquer the Earth country by country through military force.

Release history
World Empire was originally released for DOS.  It featured 16-colour EGA graphics and a classical musical score played through the PC speaker.  Later versions were released for Microsoft Windows and include full-colour graphics and MIDI music.  All versions are shareware.

Gameplay
Each player is controlled by either a human or the computer; recent versions of the game have included the option of network play.  At the beginning of the game, the players choose a unique political ideology, select or are assigned a flag and a home country, and are given the same number of armies.  Each country on the map is assigned a political ideology.  Players then take turns during which they attack neighbouring countries and, if successful, occupy them with some of their armies.  If the occupied country's political ideology matches that of the player, then only one occupying army is needed; otherwise, the game informs the player how many more occupying armies are required.  If the player fails to maintain the minimum number of occupying armies in a country, the country may revolt and switch allegiances to another player.  Players can end their turns at any time, and usually do so when they have no further armies with which to attack.  At the beginning of each turn other than the first, players receives a number of armies calculated from the number of countries they hold, plus a bonus if they control entire continents.

The game ends once one player has occupied all the opponents' countries, or when all the opponents have surrendered.

Critical reception
The game was favourably reviewed in PC Plus, Computer Shopper, Windows User, and Computer Gaming World. World Empire III won 1995's Best Shareware Strategy Game Award from Ziff-Davis and Computer Gaming World.

References

External links
World Empire V

1991 video games
1992 video games
1994 video games
1999 video games
2003 video games
DOS games
Grand strategy video games
Multiplayer and single-player video games
Multiplayer online games
Shareware
Turn-based strategy video games
Video games developed in the United States
Windows games